Celine Dion is the eleventh studio album by Canadian singer Celine Dion, and her second English-language album. It was originally released by Columbia Records on 30 March 1992, and features the Grammy and Academy Award-winning song "Beauty and the Beast", and other hits like "If You Asked Me To" and "Love Can Move Mountains". The album was produced by Walter Afanasieff, Ric Wake, Guy Roche and Humberto Gatica. It reached number one in Quebec, number three in Canada and was certified Diamond there, denoting shipments of over one million copies in this country. At the 35th Annual Grammy Awards, Celine Dion was nominated for the Grammy Award for Best Female Pop Vocal Performance. The album has sold over five million copies worldwide. To support it, Dion toured as the opening act for Michael Bolton on his "Time, Love and Tenderness Tour" in the summer of 1992 through the United States. From August 1992 till March 1993, she toured Canada with her Celine Dion in Concert tour.

Background and content
Dion's real international breakthrough came when she paired up with Peabo Bryson to record the title track to Walt Disney Pictures animated film Beauty and the Beast (1991). The song captured a musical style that Dion would utilize in the future: sweeping, classical and soft rock influenced ballads with soft instrumentation. Both a critical and commercial smash, the song became her second United States top 10 hit, and also won many awards. As with Dion's earlier releases, the album had an overtone of love.

Dion worked with a new team of writers and producers on her eponymous album. Five songs were written by Diane Warren. "With This Tear" was a gift from Prince who wrote the song especially for Dion. The tracks were produced mainly by Walter Afanasieff, Ric Wake and Guy Roche.

By 1992, the release of her previous English-language album Unison (1990) and Celine Dion, as well as various media appearances, had propelled Dion to superstardom in North America. She had achieved one of her main objectives: wedging her way into the anglophone market and establishing fame. Apart from her rising success, there were also changes in Dion's personal life, as René Angélil would make the transition from manager to lover. However, the relationship was kept a secret as both feared that the public would find the twenty-six-year difference between their ages incongruous.

The European version of Celine Dion includes "Where Does My Heart Beat Now" as a bonus track. The album was re-released on 7 September 1992 in Australia with a bonus disc containing four songs which had been previously released as singles from Unison.

"Send Me a Lover" was a "leftover" from the recording sessions of the Celine Dion album and it was released in 1994 on the charity compilation Kumbaya Album 1994.

Critical reception

The album has received varied reviews. Stephen Thomas Erlewine from AllMusic wrote that "Celine Dion's self-titled follow-up to her successful American debut is even stronger and more accomplished". Arion Berger from Entertainment Weekly commented, "She hits all the notes on Prince's graceful, desperate "With This Tear", but clearly she has more voice than heart". Music critic Robert Christgau called it the "worst album of the year—that I can remember". Jan DeKnock of Chicago Tribune said that the album "is even better, because the young singer-only 24-has developed enough confidence in her second language to really deliver the emotional nuances of a lyric, especially in the ballads that dominate this album. [...] Dion has clearly joined Mariah Carey and Whitney Houston as one of the premier voices on the pop scene". Parry Gettelman from Orlando Sentinel felt that Dion "really excels" on the three dance tracks "in the Lisa Stansfield mold"; "Love Can Move Mountains", "Did You Give Enough Love" and "Little Bit of Love".

Commercial performance
The album has sold over five million copies worldwide. As of May 2016, Celine Dion has sold 2,400,000 copies in the United States according to Nielsen SoundScan, with an additional 624,000 units sold at BMG Music Club. SoundScan does not count albums sold through clubs like the BMG Music Service, which were significantly popular in the 1990s. It was certified 2× Platinum in the United States and reached number 34 on the Billboard 200 chart. Dion's popularity was also showing in Canada where the album topped the chart in Quebec for six weeks, peaked at number three on the Canadian Albums Chart and was certified Diamond for one million copies sold.

In other regions of the world, Celine Dion peaked at number 15 in Australia, number 31 in New Zealand, number 59 in Japan, and number 70 in the United Kingdom. It was also certified Platinum in Australia and Gold in the UK and Japan. Dion received her first World Music Award for Best Selling Canadian Female Recording Artist of the Year.

The most successful single from the album was "Beauty and the Beast," which peaked at number nine on the Billboard Hot 100 and was certified Gold in the United States. Other singles, which reached the US top 40 included: "If You Asked Me To" (number four), "Nothing Broken but My Heart" (number 29) and "Love Can Move Mountains" (number 36).

Industry awards

Celine Dion was nominated for the Grammy Award for Best Pop Vocal Performance, Female and Juno Award for Album of the Year. She also won the Female Vocalist of the Year and was nominated for the Canadian Entertainer of the Year. Dion also won the Billboard International Creative Achievement Award and was nominated for the Billboard Music Award for Hot Adult Contemporary Artist. She won the Félix Award for the Artist of the Year Achieving the Most Success in a Language Other Than French and Artist of the Year Achieving the Most Success Outside Quebec. Dion won the World Music Award for World's Best Selling Canadian Female Artist of the Year and Governor General's Award (Medal of Recognition for the Contribution to Canadian Culture).

"Beauty and the Beast" won the Grammy Award for Best Pop Performance by a Duo or Group with Vocals and Grammy Award for Best Song Written Specifically for a Motion Picture or Television, and was nominated for the Grammy Award for Record of the Year and Song of the Year. It also won the Academy Award for Best Original Song, Golden Globe Award for Best Original Song, Juno Award for Single of the Year, ASCAP Film and Television Music Award for Most Performed Song from Motion Picture and ASCAP Pop Award for Most Performed Song.

"If You Asked Me To" won the ASCAP Pop Award for Most Performed Song and was nominated for the Juno Award for Single of the Year and Billboard Music Award for Hot Adult Contemporary Single of the Year. "Nothing Broken but My Heart” won the ASCAP Pop Award for Most Performed Song. "Love Can Move Mountains" won the Juno Award for Dance Recording of the Year and was nominated for the Single of the Year. The performance of "Love Can Move Mountains" at the Juno Awards of 1993 was nominated for the Gemini Award for Best Performance in a Variety Program or Series.

Track listing

Notes
  signifies an additional producer

Personnel
Adapted from AllMusic.

 Walter Afanasieff – arranger, bass, guitar, acoustic guitar , keyboards, orchestral arrangements, organ, hammond organ , producer, programming, synclavier, synthesizer, synthesizer bass, vocal arrangement, vocal producer
 Ken Allardyce – engineer
 René Angélil – management
 Israel Baker – violin
 Marilyn Baker – viola
 Mickey Baker – viola
 Greg Bannan – production coordination
 David Barratt – production coordination
 Kitty Beethoven – background vocals
 Fred "Re-Run" Berry – Flugelhorn
 Frederick Berry – Flugelhorn, Soloist
 Kyle Bess – engineer
 David Betancourt – engineer
 Rick Bieder – engineer
 Teruko Brooks – violin
 Peabo Bryson – guest artist, performer, primary artist, vocals
 Robbie Buchanan – arranger, keyboards, piano
 Bob Cadway – engineer, mixing, tracking
 Bruce Calder – engineer
 Russ Cantor – violin
 Dana Jon Chappelle – engineer, mixing
 Gary Cirimelli – programming, synclavier, background vocals
 Ronald Clark – violin
 Liz Constantine – background vocals
 Van Coppock – assistant engineer
 Orion Crawford – copyist
 Joey Diggs – background vocals
 Céline Dion – primary artist, speech/speaker/speaking part, spoken word, vocals, background vocals 
 John Doelp – executive producer
 Nancy Donald – art direction
 Bruce Dukov – violin
 Felipe Elgueta – engineer
 Paul Ericksen – engineer
 Clare Fischer – arranger, conductor, string arrangements
 Chris Fogel – assistant engineer
 Arne Frager – string engineer
 Kenny G – guest artist, soprano sax
 Bruce Gaitsch – guitar
 Pamela Gates – violin
 Humberto Gatica – engineer, mixing, producer
 Claude Gaudette – arranger, keyboards, programming
 Gary Gertzweig – violin
 Michael Gilbert – engineer
 Edward Green – violin
 Sandy Griffith – background vocals
 Noel Hazen – assistant engineer
 Mark Hensley – engineer
 Dan Hetzel – engineer
 Jim Hughart – contrabass
 Larry Jacobs – background vocals 
 Davida Johnson – violin
 Jimmy Johnson – bass
 Jude Johnson – cello
 Melisa Kary – background vocals
 Neill King – engineer
 Ren Klyce – programming, sampling, synclavier
 Dave Koz – guest artist, saxophone
 Matthew "Boomer" La Monica – engineer
 Manny Lacarrubba – engineer
 Michael Landau – guitar
 Norma Leonard – violin
 Mario Lucy – assistant engineer, engineer
 Vito Luprano – executive producer
 Patrick MacDougall – mixing
 Margot MacLaine – viola
 Earl Madison – celli, cello
 Larry Mah – engineer
 Brian Malouf – mixing
 Jean McClain – background vocals 
 Casey McMackin – assistant engineer
 Vladimir Meller – mastering
 Betty Moor – violin
 Jorge Moraga – viola
 Ralph Morrison III – violin
 Michael Nowak – viola
 Nils Oliver – celli, cello
 Rafael Padilla – percussion
 Victoria Pearson – photography
 Joel Peskin – oboe, synthesizer
 Ken Phillips – production coordination
 Brian Pollack – assistant engineer, engineer
 Simon Pressey – engineer
 Vicki Randle – background vocals
 Claytoven Richardson – background vocals
 John "J.R." Robinson – drums
 Guy Roche – arranger, engineer, keyboards, producer, synthesizer
 Alejandro Rodriguez – engineer
 Harry Scorzo – violin
 Frederick Seykora – celli, cello
 Dan Shea – keyboards, programming
 David Shea – keyboards, synthesizer
 Paul Shure – violin
 David Stenske – viola
 Mick Stern – engineer
 Robert Stone – contrabass
 Robert Jeffrey Stone – double bass
 Barbara Stout – production coordination
 Rich Tancredi – arranger
 Pamela Thompkins – violin
 Michael Thompson – guitar
 Jeanie Tracy – background vocals
 Jeffrey "C.J." Vanston – keyboards
 Alan de Veritch – viola
 Ric Wake – arranger, producer
 Francine Walsh – violin
 Diane Warren – background vocals
 Frank Wolf – engineer
 Terry Wood – background vocals
 Thomas R. Yezzi – engineer
 Richard Zuckerman – executive producer

Charts

Weekly charts

Year-end charts

Certifications and sales

Release history

Notes

See also
 List of diamond-certified albums in Canada

References

External links
 

1992 albums
550 Music albums
Columbia Records albums
Epic Records albums
Celine Dion albums
Albums produced by Guy Roche
Albums produced by Humberto Gatica
Albums produced by Ric Wake
Albums produced by Walter Afanasieff